DeQuan Jones (born June 20, 1990) is an American professional basketball player for the Shiga Lakes of the Japanese B.League. He played college basketball for the University of Miami.

High school career
Jones attended Joseph Wheeler High School in Marietta, Georgia. He averaged 15.2 points, 6.7 rebounds and 4.0 blocks per game as a senior en route to Class 5-A Player of the Year honors by the Atlanta Journal-Constitution and Northwest Player of the Year accolades. He helped Wildcats finish 30-3 with a No. 18 national ranking by USA Today; they advanced to the state title game, where the Wildcats lost by just three points.

College career

In his four-year Hurricane career, Jones appeared in 111 games and started in 35, recording 508 points, 268 rebounds, 53 assists, 52 steals and 51 blocks. On November 25, 2009, he recorded a career high 16 points against Florida Gulf Coast.

On December 20, 2011, Jones received approval to return to competition after he sat out the season's first 10 games because of an NCAA investigation into recruiting allegations. On March 29, 2012, he participated in the 24th Annual State Farm College Slam Dunk and Three-Point Contest at the Final Four.

Professional career

Orlando Magic (2012–2013)
After going undrafted in the 2012 NBA draft, Jones joined the Orlando Magic for the 2012 NBA Summer League. On September 29, 2012, he signed with the Magic. On March 27, 2013, he scored a season-high 13 points on 6-of-9 shooting in a 108–114 loss to the Charlotte Bobcats.

In July 2013, Jones re-joined the Orlando Magic for the 2013 NBA Summer League. On September 29, 2013, he signed with the Sacramento Kings. However, he was later waived by the Kings on October 15, 2013 after appearing in one preseason game.

Reno Bighorns (2013–2014)
In November 2013, he was acquired by the Reno Bighorns of the NBA Development League as an affiliate player.

Pallacanestro Cantù (2014–2015)
In July 2014, Jones joined the Indiana Pacers for the Orlando Summer League and the New Orleans Pelicans for the Las Vegas Summer League. On July 27, he signed a one-year deal with Pallacanestro Cantù of the Lega Basket Serie A. On January 8, 2015, he was named a participant in the 2015 Serie A All-Star Weekend Slam Dunk Contest. He was also named to the "Named Sport Team" for the BEKO All-Star Game held on January 17, going on to score 26 points to help Named Sport defeat the "Dolomiti Energia Team", 146–143. In 35 league games for Cantù in 2014–15, he averaged 8.2 points and 3.3 rebounds per game. He also averaged 8.2 points and 4.3 rebounds in 17 Eurocup games.

Chiba Jets Funabashi (2015–2016)
On September 25, 2015, Jones signed with the Atlanta Hawks. However, he was later waived by the Hawks on October 24 after appearing in four preseason games. On November 29, he signed with the Chiba Jets of the Japanese NBL.

Lille Métropole (2016–2017)
On September 15, 2016, Jones was included in the roster of Lille Métropole of the LNB Pro B.

Fort Wayne Mad Ants (2017–2018)
On September 7, 2017, Jones signed with the Indiana Pacers of the NBA, on a training camp deal. He was waived on October 14 as one of the team’s final preseason roster cuts. He played the season with the Pacers' NBA G League affiliate, the Fort Wayne Mad Ants and won the G Leagues' Most Improved Player award.

Anhui Dragons (2018)
On May 5, 2018, Jones signed with Anhui Dragons of the Chinese NBL.

Hapoel Holon (2018–2019)
On July 31, 2018, Jones joined the Israeli team Hapoel Holon, signing a one-year deal with an option for another one. On October 20, 2018, Jones recorded a season-high 29 point, shooting 11-of-15 from the field, along with four rebounds and two blocks in a 108–102 overtime win over Hapoel Eilat. In 52 games played during the 2018–19 season, he averaged 12.4 points, 3.3 rebounds and 1.1 assists per game, shooting 40.1 percent from three-point range.

Pallacanestro Trieste (2019–2020)
On August 12, 2019, Jones returned to Italy for a second stint, signing with Pallacanestro Trieste for the 2019–20 season.

Nishinomiya Storks (2020-present)
On July 31, 2020, Jones signed in Japan for the Nishinomiya Storks.

Career statistics

NBA

Regular season

|-
| style="text-align:left;"| 
| style="text-align:left;"| Orlando
| 63 || 17 || 12.7 || .436 || .257 || .667 || 1.7 || .3 || .3 || .3 || 3.7
|- class="sortbottom"
| style="text-align:left;"| Career
| style="text-align:left;"|
| 63 || 17 || 12.7 || .436 || .257 || .667 || 1.7 || .3 || .3 || .3 || 3.7

College

|-
| style="text-align:left;"| 2008–09
| style="text-align:left;"| Miami
| 32 || 3 || 11.0 || .337 || .077 || .633 || 1.7 || .5 || .3 || .4 || 2.7
|-
| style="text-align:left;"| 2009–10
| style="text-align:left;"| Miami
| 28 || 20 || 16.6 || .533 || .231 || .667 || 2.5 || .5 || .5 || .6 || 5.7
|-
| style="text-align:left;"| 2010–11
| style="text-align:left;"| Miami
| 28 || 10 || 13.9 || .419 || .083 || .611 || 2.5 || .5 || .5 || .4 || 4.5
|-
| style="text-align:left;"| 2011–12
| style="text-align:left;"| Miami
| 23 || 2 || 17.3 || .451 || .250 || .620 || 3.6 || .4 || .6 || .5 || 5.9
|-

Personal
Jones is the son of Irene Bell and Clady Jones, and has a brother, Camron.

References

External links
Eurocupbasketball.com profile
Eurobasket.com profile
RealGM profile
NBA D-League profile 
LNB Pro B profile

1990 births
Living people
Anhui Dragons players
American expatriate basketball people in China
American expatriate basketball people in France
American expatriate basketball people in Israel
American expatriate basketball people in Italy
American expatriate basketball people in Japan
American men's basketball players
Basketball players from Georgia (U.S. state)
Chiba Jets Funabashi players
Fort Wayne Mad Ants players
Hapoel Holon players
Lega Basket Serie A players
Miami Hurricanes men's basketball players
Orlando Magic players
Pallacanestro Cantù players
Pallacanestro Trieste players
People from Stone Mountain, Georgia
Reno Bighorns players
Small forwards
Sportspeople from DeKalb County, Georgia
Undrafted National Basketball Association players